My Dog Skip is a memoir by Willie Morris published by Random House in 1995.

My Dog Skip is the story  about nine-year-old Willie Morris growing up in Yazoo City, Mississippi, a tale of a boy and his dog in a small, sleepy Southern town that teaches about family, friendship, love, devotion, trust and bravery. Willie and Skip's relationship goes beyond that of owner and dog, but is a relationship recognized and celebrated by the entire town.

In 2000, the book was made into a film of the same name. Although Skip was a Fox Terrier, a number of Jack Russell terriers were used in filming, two of which were Moose, and Moose's son Enzo who both portrayed Eddie on NBC's sitcom Frasier.

External links
http://www.randomhouse.com/vintage/screen/books/skipexcerpt.html

1995 non-fiction books
American autobiographies
Autobiographies adapted into films
Random House books